Clarence, sometimes referred to as The Clarence, was an English association football club from Battersea, founded in 1876 by Henry Morton-Carr, an Old Carthusian who later founded the Belgrave Harriers Athletic Club.  The club took its name from a hotel in Winstanley Road, near to Battersea Park.

The club's first recorded match was a 1–0 win at home to Trojans. For its first three seasons, the club played mostly low-key matches, many of which were not reported.  In 1879-80 the club entered the FA Cup for the first time, but lost 5–2 at Pilgrims F.C. in the first round.  The following season, the club lost 6–0 at Marlow in the first round, having turned up to the match with only ten men, and seems to have disbanded soon afterwards; four of its players joined Morton Rangers for 1881 and the club was not a member of the London Football Association on the latter's foundation in 1882.

The club is not related to another Clarence football club, founded in 1875 as the works side for Maple & Co. and playing in Willesden Green

Colours

The club played in blue with red stripes in 1876–77, and changed the following season to blue and black.

References

Association football clubs established in 1876
Defunct football clubs in England
1876 establishments in England
Association football clubs established in the 19th century